28th Division or 28th Infantry Division may refer to:

Infantry divisions:
 28th Division (German Empire)
 28th Reserve Division (German Empire)
 28th Jäger Division (Wehrmacht)
 28th Infantry Division Aosta, Kingdom of Italy
 28th Division (Imperial Japanese Army)
 28th Infantry Division (Poland)

 28th Division (Spain)
 28th Division (United Kingdom)
 28th Infantry Division (United States)
28th Infantry Division of Kordestan, Iran

Aviation divisions:
 28th Air Division, United States Air Force